The Tour of Peninsular is an annual professional road bicycle racing stage race held in Malaysia since 2019. The race is part of the UCI Asia Tour and was classified by the International Cycling Union (UCI) as a 2.1 category race. The first edition was won by Spanish rider Marcos García.

Past winners

2019
Points classification - Rohan Du Plooy
Mountain classification - Marcos García
Team classification - Kinan Cycling Team
Stage 1 winner - Elchin Asadov
Stage 2 winner - Rohan Du Plooy
Stage 3 winner - Nur Amirul Fakhruddin Mazuki
Stage 4 winner - Marcos García
Stage 5 winner - Cristian Raileanu

References

Cycle races in Malaysia
UCI Asia Tour races
Recurring sporting events established in 2019
2019 establishments in Malaysia